Kazir Hat is the administrative center and main market place of Bhujpur Thana of Fatikchhari Upazila, in the Chittagong District of the Chittagong Division, southeast Bangladesh.

It is located on the Chittagong–Ramgarh (R151) highway.

References

Fatikchhari Upazila
Populated places in Chittagong Division
Towns in Bangladesh